Monticello is an American Viticultural Area (AVA) located in the central Piedmont region of the Commonwealth of Virginia. It was established by the Bureau of Alcohol, Tobacco and Firearms (ATF) on February 22, 1984 after six wine grape growers in the Charlottesville area petitioned the ATF to designate a viticultural area to be known as “Monticello.”  The name  "Monticello" is known nationally and locally as the historic home of Thomas Jefferson, located near the center of the area.  Monticello AVA includes most of Albemarle, Fluvanna, Greene, Orange, and Nelson counties.  The area is nestled along the eastern slopes of the Blue Ridge Mountains and encompasses the small ridge known as the Southwest Mountains.  There are approximately 30 varieties of grapes grown in the Monticello AVA.  However, the most notable grapes grown in the area include Cabernet Franc, Chardonnay and Viognier. The hardiness zone is 7a except in some higher vineyards which are 6b. In 2019, the Tax and Trade Bureau (TTB) granted a petition to expand the AVA by approximately  into Fluvanna County.

History
The earliest recorded attempts at winemaking in the area occurred in the 1770s, when Thomas Jefferson provided financial support to Italian winemaker, Philip Mazzei, who made a small quantity of wine from the native grapes, but without much success. The area was planted in 1774. In 1776, with the advent of the Revolutionary war, Jefferson and George Washington dispatched Mazzei back to Italy to solicit war funding from the Duke of Tuscany. As was the practice at that time, Mazzei rented his home, in this instance to the Hessian cavalry officer Friedrich Adolf Riedesel, a prisoner of war who had been captured at Saratoga and was imprisoned in the Charlottesville barracks. Riedesel moved his entire staff up to Mazzei's home and turned their horses out to pasture in the infant vineyards. The vineyards were destroyed.

Terroir
The geographical features of gaps in the Blue Ridge Mountains to the east causes  “rivers of cold air” to flow through corridors that converge east of the Monticello AVA. It is manifested by the tendency of the cool air to sink along the surrounding topography and drain to the surface of the valley floors. This atmospheric phenomenon draws warmer air closer to the ground and reduces the incidence of frost damage. As a result, the climate is favorable to viticulture in Monticello AVA where temperatures are  warmer than the surrounding areas. The warmer weather produces a longer growing season and protection from vine-freeze which can be fatal to ripening grapes. The season is a minimum of 190-200 day average in the AVA compared to areas further east and south that average 150 days and less.

References

External links
Monticello Wine Trail
Central Virginia region from the official Virginia Wine site.
 TTB AVA Map

Geography of Albemarle County, Virginia
American Viticultural Areas
Geography of Greene County, Virginia
Geography of Nelson County, Virginia
Geography of Orange County, Virginia
Virginia wine
1984 establishments in Virginia